Shia Ulema Council (S.U.C) (English: Council of Shiite Muslim Scholars) is a Shiite Muslim religio-political organization in Pakistan and a board of Shiite Muslim affiliated with the Islamic council of Iran. Its goal was to introduce  Twelver Shiite Islam as personal law for the Shiite Muslims of Pakistan, so that no other school of thought may be forcefully imposed on them to follow. It is also known as Islami Tehreek or Tehrik-e-Jafaria in Pakistan.

Leadership and Objectives
Shia Ulema Council is being led by Syed Sajid Ali Naqvi. The main objective of this party is to create an Islamic rule in the country according to the wishes of all factions of Islamic society of Pakistan.

The Shiite Muslim body of scholars, describes the scholarly education provided for Shiite Muslims clergy in the schools around the center of Shiite Islamic theology in Najaf, Iraq.

The main objective of this organisation was to protect the rights of Shia Muslims of Pakistan and give them a voice in the Parliament of Pakistan, they do not advocate a Shia Islamic state and have cordial relations with Sunni organization including Sunni Ittehad Council that is why they joined coalition of religious political parties i.e. Muttahida Majlis-e-Amal that won 53 out of 272 elected members in legislative elections held on October 20, 2002.

Electoral history
Shia Ulema Council Pakistan participated in Election in 1988 after that Shia Ulema Council Pakistan regularly took part in elections.
Shia Ulema Council Pakistan formerly Tehreek-e-Jafaria Pakistan participated in Gilgit Baltistan elections in the early 1990s and formed a government.
Shia Ulema Council Pakistan formerly Tehreek-e-Jafaria Pakistan was a part of the Muttahida Majlis-e-Amal coalition of Islamist political parties that won 11.3% of the popular vote and 53 out of 272 seats in the legislative elections held on October 20, 2002.

General Elections, 2013
Election Commission of Pakistan Allot "Lock & Key" Symbol to "Islami Tehreek Pakistan"  . During 2013 elections, the Shia Ulema Council Pakistan announced to allied itself with the Pakistan Peoples Party and won a number of seats, the candidates of the Pakistan Peoples Party are also representing the Shia Ulema Council Pakistan in the respective assemblies.

Terrorist attacks on leaders, candidates & workers
Supreme Leader of Shiite of Pakistan & President of SUC/TJP Allama Syed Arif Hussain Al Hussaini
Hussaini was killed in Peshawar on August 5, 1988. After having prayed at a local Masjid, he was confronted by two gunmen and shot; The attackers escaped. Allama Arif Hussaini martyred of his wounds while being transported by ambulance to a local hospital.

January, 2014
Muzaffargarh president of the Shia Ulema Council, Syed Altaf Hussain Bukhari, and his security guard were injured when unidentified assailants opened fire at them on January 18, 2014 at night when they were heading towards their home.

See also
 Tehrik-e-Jafaria
 Majlis Wahdat-e-Muslimeen
 Imamia Students Organization
 Sipah-e-Muhammad Pakistan

References

8. http://shiitenews.org/index.php/pakistan/item/11385-shia-ulema-council-condemns-suicidal-attack-on-juif-chief-fazal-ur-rehman

Political parties in Pakistan
Shia Islam in Pakistan